is a Japanese international school in Singapore, covering elementary and junior high school levels. There are two separate elementary schools of the JSS in Clementi and Changi, while junior high school division is located in West Coast. As of 2013 this Japanese international school is the largest overseas Japanese school in the world.

History
The original school was founded in 1912 and opened at 131 Middle Road. At the time, one teacher taught 28 students. A new school built by The Japan Club, now known as The Japanese Association, opened at 155 Waterloo Street in 1920. As of 2014 the Stamford Girls' School is located at that site. Prior to the start of World War II the school had moved to several different sites: Bencoolen Street, Wilkie Road, and Short Street. In 1941, when the war started, the British Army closed the school. When the Japanese occupied Singapore, the government opened the Shonan First People's School. In 1945 the British re-took Singapore and closed the Shonan school.

A Japanese school facility opened in 1964 at what is now the Newton Post Office on Bukit Timah Road. It closed in July 1966. In September 1966 the Japanese government officially re-established the Japanese school with 3 teachers and 27 students. At first it had only primary school and was located in a residential building in Dalvey Estate. This facility closed in March 1968. In April 1968 the school moved to Swiss Cottage Estate, the black and white bungalow. The secondary school opened in 1970. The primary school and the secondary school at Swiss Cottage Estate closed in July 1971. The school moved to West Coast Road, where it opened in August of that year. In 1971 the school had 171 students. In 1976 this number increased to 588. Due to the increase in students and the strain on the existing campus, the school's West Coast campus closed in March 1976 and the school moved to a newly built campus Clementi Road.

In 1984 construction was completed a new secondary school campus on West Coast Road. During that year about 2,000 students attended the campuses of the Japanese school. In April 1995 the Japanese Primary School Changi Campus opened, taking grades 5 through 6, while the Clementi campus served grades 1 through 4. Beginning in April 1998 the two primary schools began functioning as separate 1–6 campuses with different principals. As of April 1998 there were a total of 2,445 students and 163 teachers in the school system, with 993 students at the Changi primary campus, 836 students at the Clementi campus, and 616 students at the secondary campus.

Divisions and campuses

The  Clementi Campus has served as the school's headquarters after the Clementi and Changi primary schools were separated in 1998. This campus is across from the National University of Singapore. The campus includes an auditorium, a gymnasium, two libraries, an audiovisual studio, a laboratory, a sports field, a computer laboratory, a swimming pool, two playgrounds, music immersion rooms, a pet corner, and rooms for specialised studies including home economics, music, and arts and crafts. The campus includes heritage rooms for the display of historical items and books and photographs valued by the community.

The  Changi Campus was built to resemble a traditional Japanese house. The campus includes an auditorium, a gymnasium, a multi-purpose hall, and rooms for specialised studies including English conversation, music, and arts and crafts. The campus also includes a display room for international programmes.

The Japanese Secondary School is located in the West Coast Campus. Most first year students at the junior high school level had matriculated from the elementary school division of the Japanese School Singapore. Some students entering the first year of junior high school had previously attended schools in Japan. The  junior high school campus includes a gymnasium/auditorium, a library, a swimming pool, a sports field, a tennis court, computer laboratories, a playground, audio-visual rooms, specialised studies rooms for arts and crafts and for music and arts, a science laboratory, a language laboratory.

See also

 Japanese expatriates in Singapore
 Waseda Shibuya Senior High School in Singapore (Japanese international high school in Singapore)

References

Further reading

Online access
 Dohi, Yutaka (土肥 豊; Osaka University of Comprehensive Children Education). "The Present Situation and the Problems of the Japanese School and the Japanese Supplementary School in Singapore" (シンガポールの日本人学校の現状と課題; Archive). 大阪総合保育大学紀要 (6), A195-A217, 2012-03-20. Osaka University of Comprehensive Children Education. See profile at CiNii. English abstract available.
 Koshii, Ikuo (越井 郁朗). "The Japanese School in Singapore" (Archive; シンガポール日本人学校について). Human Sciences (人間科学論集). (20), p25-41, 1988. 大阪府立大学人間科学研究会. See profile at CiNii, See profile at Osaka Prefecture University Education and Research Archives (OPERA; 大阪府立大学学術情報リポジトリ). English abstract available.
 Ozawa, Michimasa (小澤 至賢; 国立特殊教育総合研究所教育相談部). "クアラルンプール日本人学校,シンガポール日本人学校チャンギ校及び中学部,バンコク日本人学校における特別支援教育の実情と教育相談支援" (Archive). 世界の特殊教育 21, 51–55, 2007–03. National Institute of Special Needs Education (独立行政法人国立特別支援教育総合研究所). See profile at CiNii.
 上久保 達夫 (中京短期大学). "384 シンガポール日本人学校生徒達の異文化社会における異文化体験 : 異文化体験と国際化の問題(III-8部会 国際化と教育)" (29 June 2022 Archive). 日本教育社会学会大会発表要旨集録 (41), 228–229, 1989-10-06. The Japan Society of Educational Sociology (日本教育社会学会). See profile at CiNii.
 Nagane, Tomohiro (長根 智洋; 愛知教育大学附属高等学校) and Ryoichi Kato (加藤 良一 Katō Ryōichi; 山形大学地域教育文化学部). "11E-104 シンガポール日本人学校における理科教育と総合的な学習 : 地域の利点を生かした理科教育の試みと総合的な学習への発展(環境教育・STS学習・総合的学習,一般研究発表(口頭発表))" (paid access required). 日本理科教育学会全国大会要項 (63), 358, 2013-08-10. Society of Japan Science Teaching (日本理科教育学会). See profile at CiNii.

No online access
 Nagasawa, Atsushi (永沢 敦志; 前シンガポール日本人学校教諭・青森県浪岡町立浪岡中学校教諭). "シンガポール日本人学校中学部での3年間 : 学級担任・学年主任としての海外子女との関わり." 在外教育施設における指導実践記録 22, 95–98, 1999. Tokyo Gakugei University. See profile at CiNii.
 Hosoya, Yuji (細谷 祐司 Hosoya Yūji; 前シンガポール日本人学校中学部教諭・奈良県大和郡山市立郡山中学校教諭). "シンガポール日本人学校(中学部)での選択理科の取り組み : 不思議発見!小麦粉ワールド." 在外教育施設における指導実践記録 23, 15–18, 2000. Tokyo Gakugei University. See profile at CiNii.
 伊藤 正延. "シンガポール日本人学校に勤務して (海外の日本人子女教育)." The Monthly Journal of Mombusho (文部時報) (1135), 63–65, 1972–01. ぎょうせい. See profile at CiNii.
 笹川 清喜, 山路 進, and 波多野 和彦. "TV会議システムによる海外校との交流学習の試み : シンガポール日本人学校との交流を通して." Informatio : 江戸川大学の情報教育と環境 10, 51–59, 2013–03. Edogawa University. See profile at CiNii.
 間瀬 靜夫. "世界最大のシンガポール日本人学校から世界最小のグァテマラ日本人学校へ." Singapore (シンガポール) 2010(1), 29–36, 2010–03. 日本シンガポール協会. See profile at CiNii.
 坪井 健司. "イベント報告 第11回 シンガポール日本人学校OB&OG懇親会." シンガポール = Singapore (268), 39–41, 2014. 日本シンガポール協会. See profile at CiNii.
 坪井 健司. "イベント報告 第9回 シンガポール日本人学校OB&OG懇親会." シンガポール = Singapore (259), 39–42, 2012. 日本シンガポール協会. See profile at CiNii.
 坪井 健司. "イベント報告 第5回 シンガポール日本人学校OB&OGハイティ." Singapore (シンガポール) 2008(3), 36–38, 2008–09. 日本シンガポール協会. See profile at CiNii.
 関口 茂. "イベント報告 その1 第3回シンガポール日本人学校OB懇親会報告." Singapore (シンガポール) 2006(3), 37–41, 2006–09 . 日本シンガポール協会. See profile at CiNii.
 関口 茂. "イベント報告 その2・第2回シンガポール日本人学校OB懇親会報告." Singapore (シンガポール) 2005(3), 31–34, 2005–09. 日本シンガポール協会. See profile at CiNii.
 関口 茂. "イベント報告 シンガポール日本人学校OB懇親会." Singapore (シンガポール) 2004(3), 37–41, 2004–09. 日本シンガポール協会. See profile at CiNii.
 "イベント報告 第4回 シンガポール日本人学校OB&OG懇親会." Singapore (シンガポール) 2007(3), 35–39, 2007–09. 日本シンガポール協会. See profile at CiNii.
 継田 昌博 (北海道札幌市立幌北小学校・シンガポール日本人学校小学部クレメンティ校(前)). "シンガポール日本人学校小学部クレメンティ校の英語教育(第7章その他)." 在外教育施設における指導実践記録 28, 152–155, 2005. Tokyo Gakugei University. See profile at CiNii.
 山田 晃. "KANSAI発 明日へのメッセージ 自由にはばたけ、生き生き子どもたち!!シンガポール日本人学校と総合的な学習の時間の展開." 消費者情報 (309), 1–3, 2000–03. 関西消費者協会. See profile at CiNii.

External links

 Japanese School Singapore
 Japanese School Singapore 

Japanese international schools in Singapore
1912 establishments in Singapore
Educational institutions established in 1912
Singapore